Rafael Loredo Silva (born 25 August 1957) is a Mexican football coach and former player who is the head coach for the Guatemala under-20 national team.

References

1957 births
Living people
Mexican footballers
Mexican football managers
Footballers from Mexico City
Association football defenders
Atlético Español footballers
Club Necaxa footballers
C.F. Oaxtepec footballers
Universidad SC managers
Club Xelajú MC managers
Deportivo Petapa managers
Guatemala national football team managers
2021 CONCACAF Gold Cup managers
Mexican expatriate football managers
Expatriate football managers in Guatemala
Mexican expatriate sportspeople in Guatemala